Predicament may refer to:
 Predicament (2010 film), a comedy horror film
 Predicament (2008 film), an Iranian crime-drama film